The Cornell Big Red women's ice hockey program represents Cornell University and participates in Division I collegiate hockey in the ECAC Hockey conference. They play at the Lynah Rink in Ithaca, New York. 

The Ivy League announced in July 2020 that they would suspend play for all sports, including women's ice hockey, in the Fall 2020, due to the Coronavirus outbreak. Athletics resumed in fall of 2021.

History
The Cornell women's hockey program was started in 1971. It would only be in 1972 that the team would play its first game; it was a 4–3 victory over Scarborough. In 1972, they played eight games and lost four. In addition, the Big Red lost twice to the Pandas's program.

In 1976, Brown hosted the first ever Ivy League women's ice hockey tournament. Cornell bested Brown, Princeton and Yale to win the tournament.

On March 7, 2010, sophomore Kendice Ogilvie beat Clarkson goaltender Lauren Dahm at 7:52 mark in overtime. With the victory, Cornell won its first ECAC Tournament, and earns its first trip to the NCAA Frozen Four.

On March 13, 2010, Cornell defeated the Crimson by a score of 6–2 to earn its first ever trip to the NCAA Frozen Four. At the 2010 Frozen Four championship game, Cornell goaltender Amanda Mazzotta set a record for most saves in an NCAA Championship game with 61 saves. The former record holder was Bulldog goaltender Patricia Sautter. She had the old record of 41 set in 2003.

On January 7 and 8, 2011, Cornell freshman goaltender Lauren Slebodnik earned two shutouts in her first two career starts. On January 7, she made her NCAA debut by shutting out Yale by a 5–0 margin. With Cornell dressing just 12 skaters, she stopped all 23 Yale shots. The following night, Slebodnik shut out the Brown Bears by a 3–0 mark. Cornell only dressed 11 skaters for the game and she stopped all 15 shots.

In Jillian Saulnier's college debut versus the Colgate Raiders on October 25, she netted four goals. In her first three career NCAA games, she registered ten points (seven goals, three assists), along with a +6 rating. Her four-goal night was the first for Cornell since Jessica Campbell scored four against Robert Morris in the second game of the 2010–11 season. She scored her first career goal when she was out on the Big Red's first power play of the game. In her next game versus the Yale Bulldogs, she registered one goal and two assists, while scoring two goals in her third game versus the Brown Bears squad. For the month of October 2011, she was tied for first in the ECAC in goals scored (while the other player appeared in eight games). In a game on November 1, 2011, the Cornell Big Red scored at least nine goals in one game for the third consecutive contest. It was senior captain Chelsea Karpenko's 100th career game, as Saulnier led all Big Red players with two goals and three assists in a 9–2 triumph over the Syracuse Orange.

The Big Red had a standout year in 2019, finishing the season atop the standings in the ECAC. They lost in the ECAC championship game against Clarkson.

In 2020, Cornell finished first in the ECAC for the second year in a row, with an undefeated season in conference play at 19-0-3 ( 28-2-3 overall). They dominated the league and had an unbeaten streak of 22 games from November 30, 2019 to March 7, 2020.  The Big Red easily won their 15th Ivy League championship.  In the ECAC tournament, Cornell beat perennial rival Harvard Crimson in the semi-final by a score of 4-0.  In a surprising upset in the championship game, they lost in overtime to the Princeton Tigers by a score of 3-2. Jessie Eldridge finished the season fourth in the ECAC in points, with 43, followed by her teammate Kristin O'Neil, who tallied 41 points on the year. Izzy Daniel won Ivy League Rookie of the Year. Lindsay Browning, the Big Red's junior goalie, won Ivy League Player of the Year honors, and the MAC Goaltending Goalie of the Year. Jaime Bourbonnais won Ivy League Best Defenseman honors, and was selected as a First Team All-American.  Head Coach Doug Derraugh was recognized with two Coach of the Year awards: the Ivy League Coach of the Year (his fourth in a row) and the ECAC Hockey Coach of the Year (second in a row).  

Cornell earned a berth in the 2020 NCAA women's ice hockey tournament, but the event was cancelled due to the 2020 coronavirus pandemic. In July 2020, the Ivy League announced there would be no league play in the fall of 2020, due to continuing concerns about health.  Cornell, along with fellow Ivy League teams Harvard, Brown, Dartmouth, Princeton and Yale, resumed athletics in the fall of 2021. 

The new Toronto Six Women's National Hockey League team signed Cornell alumna Amy Curlew in 2020.

Year by year

Ivy League Champions: (15) 1976, 1977, 1978, 1979, 1980, 1981*, 1990, 1996, 2010, 2011, 2012, 2013*, 2017, 2018, 2020

* denotes shared title

Series records

Roster

2022–23 Big Red
As of September 20, 2022.

Notable players
 Rebecca Johnston
 Digit Murphy
 Johnston was the first Big Red player to be named first-team ECAC Hockey and receive rookie of the year honors. She has also been named first-team All-Ivy and Ivy League Rookie of the Year. In the 2008–09 season, Johnston's 37 point total (by mid-February) were the most points in a season for Cornell since the 1991–92 campaign (Kim Ratushny with 21 goals and 17 assists). Johnston's 37-point total in mid-February led the entire ECAC league in overall points. She was also second in the league and sixth in the NCAA in points per game with 1.85. In the 2008–09 season, Johnston's 37-point total were the most points in a season for Cornell since the 1991–92 campaign (Kim Ratushny with 21 goals and 17 assists).
 During the 2008–09 season, freshman Catherine White was second on the team in scoring (34 points). White has recorded the most points by a rookie since Dana Antal (36 points, 17 goals, 19 assists) in the 1995–96 season.
 Cyndy Schlaepfer holds the school record for points in a season with 89 during the 1976–77 season.
 Megan Shull joined the Big Red in 1987. Her on-ice career shortened by injury, Shull went on to become a children's book author. While earning her doctorate at Cornell, Shull created, The Cub Club, a mentoring program matching local girls' ice hockey players with members of the Cornell Big Red women's ice hockey team. The Cub Club still thrives today.

Olympians
Dana Antal, Team Canada 2002 Olympics - Gold Medal
Rebecca Johnston, Team Canada 2010 Olympics and 2014 Olympics - Gold Medal, 2018 Olympics - Silver Medal
Laura Fortino, Team Canada 2014 Olympics - Gold Medal, 2018 Olympics Silver Medal
Brianne Jenner, Team Canada 2014 Olympics - Gold Medal, 2018 Olympics - Silver Medal
Lauriane Rougeau, Team Canada 2014 Olympics - Gold Medal, 2018 Olympics- Silver Medal
Jillian Saulnier, Team Canada 2018 Olympics - Silver Medal

Former head coach Melody Davidson was head coach of Canada's gold medal winning women's Olympic  hockey teams in 2006 and 2010.

Awards and honors
Dianna Bell, 2002 Sarah Devens Award 
Brooke Bestwick, Defense, 2002 ECAC North Second Team
Lindsay Browning, 2019-20 Ivy League Player of the Year
Izzy Daniel, 2019-20 Ivy League Rookie of the Year
Devon Facchinato, 2021 ECAC Mandi Schwartz Student-Athlete of the Year
Laura Fortino, Defense, Freshman, 2010 First Team All-Ivy
Laura Fortino, 2010 ECAC All-Rookie Team
Rebecca Johnston, Ivy League Rookie of the Year 2007–08, Cornell (Freshman), Unanimous selection
Rebecca Johnston, First Team All-Ivy League, 2007–08, Forward, Cornell (Freshman) 
 Rebecca Johnston, 2009 First Team All-ECAC 
Chelsea Karpenko, Forward, Sophomore, 2010 Second Team All-Ivy
Chelsea Karpenko, 2011 ECAC Tournament Most Outstanding Player
Amanda Mazzotta, ECAC Defensive Player of the Week (Week of November 2, 2009) 
Amanda Mazzotta, Goaltender, Sophomore, 2010 First Team All-Ivy
Kristin O'Neill, 2018 Ivy League Player of the Year Award
Kendice Ogilvie, 2010 ECAC Tournament Most Outstanding Player
 Lauriane Rougeau, Defense, Freshman, 2010 First Team All-Ivy
 Lauriane Rougeau, 2010 Ivy League Rookie of the Year
Lauriane Rougeau, 2010 ECAC All-Rookie Team
Jillian Saulnier, ECAC Rookie of the Month (Month of October 2011)
Catherine White, 2009 ECAC Rookie of the Year 
 Catherine White Cornell, 2009 Second Team All-ECAC
 Catherine White Cornell, 2009 ECAC All-Rookie Team 
 Catherine White, 2010 ECAC Player of the Year award
 Catherine White, led the ECAC in assists in 2009–10 with 24 
 Catherine White, 2010 Women's RBK Hockey Division I All-America Second Team 
 Catherine White, Forward, Sophomore, 2010 First Team All-Ivy
 Catherine White, 2010 Ivy League Player of the Year 
 Doug Derraugh, 2010 Coach of the Year 
 Doug Derraugh, 2019 CCM/AHCA Women’s National Collegiate Coach of the Year
 Doug Derraugh, 2020 CCM/AHCA Women’s National Collegiate Coach of the Year

All-Americans
Laura Fortino, 2010 Women's RBK Hockey Division I All-America First Team 
 Laura Fortino, 2011 First Team All-America selection
 Rebecca Johnston, 2011 Second Team All-America selection
 Lauriane Rougeau, 2010 Women's RBK Hockey Division I All-America Second Team
 Lauriane Rougeau, 2011 Second Team All-America selection
Laura Fortino, 2011–12 CCM Hockey Women's Division I All-American: First Team
Rebecca Johnston, 2011–12 CCM Hockey Women's Division I All-American: First Team
Lauriane Rougeau, 2011–12 CCM Hockey Women's Division I All-American: Second Team
Jaime Bourbonnais, 2019-20 CCM Hockey Women's Division I All-American: First Team
Lindsay Browning, 2019-20 CCM Hockey Women's Division I All-American: Second Team

ECAC All-Decade Team 

 Brianne Jenner, First Team All Star
 Jillian Saulnier
 Laura Fortino
 Lauriane Rougeau

All-ECAC Hockey honors
 Rebecca Johnston, 2011–12 ECAC Hockey Player of the Year 
 Jillian Saulnier, 2011–12 ECAC Hockey Rookie of the Year
 Chelsea Karpenko, 2011–12 ECAC Hockey Best Defensive Forward
 Lauriane Rougeau, 2011–12 ECAC Hockey Best Defensive Defenseman
 Rebecca Johnston, 2011–12 All-ECAC Hockey First Team
 Brianne Jenner, 2011–12 All-ECAC Hockey First Team
 Lauriane Rougeau, 2011–12 All-ECAC Hockey First Team
 Laura Fortino, 2011–12 All-ECAC Hockey First Team
 Jillian Saulnier, 2011–12 All-ECAC Hockey Second Team
 Jillian Saulnier, 2011–12 All-ECAC Hockey Rookie Team
 Jaime Bourbonnais, 2019-2020 ECAC First Team
 Lindsay Browning, 2019-2020 ECAC First Team
 Kristin O’Neill, 2019-2020 ECAC Second Team
 Micah Zandee-Hart, 2019-2020 ECAC Second Team
 Maddie Mills, 2019-2020 ECAC Second Team

All-Ivy honors
Laura Fortino, 2010–11 Ivy League Player of the Year
Brianne Jenner, 2010–11 Ivy League Rookie of the Year
 Brianne Jenner, 2010–11 First Team All-Ivy
  Rebecca Johnston, 2010–11 First Team All-Ivy
  Chelsea Karpenko, 2010–11 First Team All-Ivy
  Laura Fortino, 2010–11 First Team All-Ivy
 Catherine White, 2010–11 Second Team All-Ivy
 Lauriane Rougeau, 2010–11 Second Team All-Ivy 
 Rebecca Johnston, 2011–12 Ivy League Player of the Year 
 Jillian Saulnier, 2011–12 Ivy League Rookie of the Year
 Rebecca Johnston, 2011–12 First Team All-Ivy
 Brianne Jenner, 2011–12 First Team All-Ivy
 Lauriane Rougeau, 2011–12 First Team All-Ivy
 Laura Fortino, 2011–12 First Team All-Ivy
 Amanda Mazzotta, 2011–12 Second Team All-Ivy
 Jillian Saulnier, 2011–12 Honorable Mention All-Ivy
 Catherine White, 2011–12 Honorable Mention All-Ivy
 Chelsea Karpenko, 2011–12 Honorable Mention All-Ivy
 Alyssa Gagliardi, 2011–12 Honorable Mention All-Ivy
 Kristin O'Neill, 2017-18 Ivy League Player of the Year
 Maddie Mills, 2017-18  Ivy League ROOKIE OF THE YEAR
 Doug Derraugh, 2017-18 Ivy League COACH OF THE YEAR
 Kristin O'Neill, 2017-18 First Team All-Ivy
 Maddie Mills, 2017-18 First Team All-Ivy
 Jaime Bourbonnais, 2017-18 First Team All-Ivy
 Marlène Boissonnault, 2017-18 First Team All-Ivy
 Lenka Serdar, 2017-18 Honorable Mention All-Ivy
 Jaime Bourbonnais, 2019-2020 Ivy League Player of the Year
 Izzy Daniels, 2019-2020 Rookie Player of the Year
 Jaime Bourbonnais, 2020 First Team All-Ivy
 Kristin O’Neill, 2020 First Team All-Ivy
 Micah Zandee-Hart, 2020 First Team All-Ivy
 Maddie Mills, 2020 Second Team All-Ivy

Big Red in professional hockey

See also
Cornell Big Red men's ice hockey

References

External links
 Cornell Big Red Official Site

 
Ice hockey teams in New York (state)
1971 establishments in New York (state)